Hackensack Meridian School of Medicine (HMSOM) is a private medical school in Nutley, New Jersey. When it opened in 2015, it was the first private medical school in New Jersey to open in decades. Originally affiliated with Seton Hall University, the Hackensack Meridian School of Medicine became independent in 2020.

HMSOM is affiliated with Hackensack Meridian Health (HMH), a network of 18 hospitals and the largest hospital network in the state after 2018 when a merger of Hackensack University Health Network (HUHN) and Meridian Health was completed with JFK Health. The merger comprises three regions across the state of NJ and the larger hospitals in each are:  Hackensack University Medical Center (HUMC) in the North, JFK Medical Center in Central NJ, and the Jersey Shore University Medical Center (JSUMC) in the South. All three regional hubs serve as educational centers for HMSOM students during their clinical years of rotations.

History

Initial establishment 
On March 11, 2015, the New Jersey State Board of Medical Examiners granted conditional approval to open a new school of medicine called the Seton Hall - Hackensack Meridian School of Medicine, pending accreditation from the Liaison Committee on Medical Education (LCME). On June 5, 2015, SHU and HUHN, now known as Hackensack Meridian Health, signed the definitive agreement that cemented their commitment to move forward with the formation of the school. In July  2015, SHU and HMHN filed as an applicant school with the LCME, and renewed that application in December  2016. On February 15, 2018, the school received its Preliminary Accreditation from the LCME.

On February 24, 2016, Seton Hall University (SHU) and Hackensack UNH named Bonita F. Stanton a nationally recognized expert on pediatric medicine, as the founding dean. This was followed by the formation of the school's executive cabinet and board of governors. Stanton died in January 2022 and Jeffrey R. Boscamp was appointed the interim dean. In December 2022, HMSOM's Board of Governors appointed Boscamp as President and Dean of HMSOM.

Independence from Seton Hall 
By April 2018, SHU had pulled out of the partnership, as the investment was too substantial for the university to afford.  At that time, SHU and HMH determined that sole membership in HMSOM would transition to HMH. In the interim, HMH assumed full financial responsibility for the operation of the school in July 2018 and, at that time, the School was renamed the Hackensack Meridian School of Medicine at Seton Hall University. On July 3, 2020, the school formally separated from SHU as an independent medical school with the name Hackensack Meridian School of Medicine.

Initial accreditations and approvals 
The New Jersey Office of Secretary of Higher Education notified HMSOM on October 2, 2019 that its petition for initial licensure to offer a Doctor of Medicine had been approved, effective immediately.  A few weeks later, the Middle States Commission on Higher Education conducted its site visit and awarded HMSOM candidate for accreditation status at its March 5, 2020 meeting. In July the New Jersey Board of Medical Examiners issued conditional approval to HMSOM. The following year, the LCME granted provisional accreditation to the medical education program. In August 2022, the Middle States Commission on Higher Education conducted a virtual Site Evaluation Team Visit and, at the commission's November 2022 meeting, awarded Full Accreditation to HMSOM.

Campus and facilities 
The campus occupies 20 acres of a 120 acre site in Nutley and Clifton, New Jersey at the former Hoffman La Roche headquarters on Route 3, a central commuting artery to New York City.  The building housing HMSOM has been renovated.

The HMSOM campus is also home to the HMH Center for Discovery and Innovation, which comprises three institutes to focus on cancer, infectious diseases and regenerative medicine research.  The Institute for Multiple Myeloma has already opened as a result of a research partnership between the HMH John Theurer Cancer Center and Georgetown Lombardi Comprehensive Cancer Center, a National Cancer Institute-designated Comprehensive Cancer Center.

See also 
 Hackensack Meridian Health

References

External links
Official website

Seton Hall University
Medical schools in New Jersey
Educational institutions established in 2015
2015 establishments in New Jersey